Stine Larsen may refer to:

Stine Larsen (runner) (born 1975), Norwegian runner
Stine Larsen (footballer) (born 1996), Danish footballer